The 1950 Tour de Romandie was the fourth edition of the Tour de Romandie cycle race and was held from 18 May to 21 May 1950. The race started and finished in Geneva. The race was won by Édouard Fachleitner.

General classification

References

1950
Tour de Romandie